Asterix and the Magic Carpet is a computer game for the Amstrad CPC, Thomson TO8, Commodore 64, Amiga, and Atari ST home computers and for PCs running MS-DOS. The game is based on the eponymous volume 28 of the popular French Asterix comic books and was released in 1987.

Gameplay 
Asterix and the Magic Carpet starts as a graphical adventure game where the player chooses a character on the screen with a cursor and selects what he should say, which then influences how the rest of the game plays out. Occasionally, there a Pac-Man-like mini arcade games where Asterix has to defeat legionnaires, wild boars, or other enemies in a maze with the help of Obelix who oscillates back and forth in a fixed section of the maze. The general approach is to catch an enemy's attention, then run away and hide behind Obelix, who will hopefully defeat the enemy.

External links

Hardcore Gaming 101: Astérix video games—Astérix chez Rahàzade

1987 video games
Amstrad CPC games
Amiga games
Atari ST games
Commodore 64 games
Coktel Vision games
DOS games
Video games based on Arabian mythology
Video games based on Asterix
Video games developed in France
Single-player video games